Shamsabad (also Romanized as Shamsābād) is a village in Shirez Rural District, Bisotun District, Harsin County, Kermanshah Province, Iran. At the 2006 census, its population was 81, in 19 families.

References 

Populated places in Harsin County